A hornet is an insect. It may also mean:

Insects
 a colloquial term for American wasps, particularly the bald-faced hornet
 a colloquial term for certain Australian potter wasp species, including the Australian hornet

In the military

Air
McDonnell Douglas F/A-18 Hornet, a jet combat aircraft
McDonnell Douglas CF-18 Hornet, a Canadian variant
De Havilland Hornet, a World War II-era combat aircraft
Hornet, original name of the Hawker Fury British biplane fighter
Hornet, unofficial name of the Curtiss 18 Model 18B triplane fighter
AGM-64 Hornet, an experimental American missile
ABC Hornet, a World War I aircraft engine
Messerschmitt Me 410 Hornisse ("Hornet"), a World War II German aircraft
Aérospatiale SA 321 Super Frelon ("Super Hornet") helicopter, also known in the Israeli Air Force as Tzir'a ("Hornet")
SNCASE SE.3200 Frelon ("Hornet") helicopter (precursor of the Aérospatiale SA 321 Super Frelon)
nickname of 443 Maritime Helicopter Squadron, a Royal Canadian Air Force unit
113 Squadron (Israel), an Israeli Air Force unit also known as the Tayeset Ha'Tsira'a ("Hornet Squadron")

Sea
HMS Hornet, ten ships of the Royal Navy
USS Hornet, eight ships of the U.S. Navy

Land
Medium Mark C Hornet, a British tank
Humber Hornet, British armoured car
M93 Hornet mine, an American anti-tank mine

Transportation

Air
Firebird Hornet, a German paraglider design
Glasflügel 206 Hornet 1970s glider
US Light Aircraft Hornet, an ultralight aircraft
Hiller YH-32 Hornet, an American ultralight helicopter
Harkness Hornet, 1920s Australian aircraft engine
Pratt & Whitney R-1690 Hornet, aero engine produced 1926–1942
Vintage Ultralight SR-1 Hornet, an American 1980s ultralight aircraft design

Land
AMC Hornet, a compact car manufactured from 1970 to 1977
Dodge Hornet (concept car), a concept car revealed in 2006
Hudson Hornet, a car manufactured from 1951 to 1957
Wolseley Hornet six, a 1930s saloon, coupé, sports and racing car
Wolseley Hornet (Mini), a variant of the original Mini car
Honda CB250F, a motorcycle known as the Hornet, first 'Hornet' released by Honda
Honda CB600F, a motorcycle known as the Hornet in Europe and Brazil
Honda CB900F, a motorcycle known as the Hornet 900 in Europe
BSA Hornet, a British motorcycle for export to the United States from 1964 to 1965

Sea
Hornet (clipper), an 1851 clipper ship which raced Flying Cloud around Cape Horn
Hornet (dinghy), a type of sailing dinghy
Hornet, a steamer involved in the Hornet incident (an 1871 diplomatic incident)

Fictional characters
Robot henchmen in Buzz Lightyear of Star Command
Hornet (comics), a name shared by three Marvel characters
Hornet (DC Thomson), a British comic of the 1960s-1970s
Hornet Squadron, an RAF squadron in a series of books by Derek Robinson
Hornet (Gobots), an alien cyborg shapeshifter
A character in the video game Hollow Knight

Sports teams

University and high school
Alabama State University Hornets
California State University, Sacramento Hornets
the teams of Concordia College Alabama
Delaware State University Hornets
Emporia State Hornets and Lady Hornets, Kansas
Kalamazoo College Hornets, Michigan
Surrattsville High School Hornets, Maryland
Midwood High School Hornets, New York
Hamilton High School (New Jersey) Hornets
Herndon High School Hornets, Virginia

Ice hockey
Bracknell Hornets, a team in the English National Hockey League
Cambridge Hornets, a Canadian Senior "AAA" team from Cambridge, Ontario
Herlev Hornets, a Danish AL-Bank Ligaen team
Huntington Hornets, an American International Hockey League team in the 1956–57 season
Langley Hornets, a former name of the Canadian Junior "A" team West Kelowna Warriors
Pittsburgh Hornets, a former American minor league team (1936–56, 1961–67)
Thunder Bay Hornets, a former Canadian Junior "A" team (1982-86)

Other
Hornet (app), a gay dating app
Charlotte Hornets (disambiguation), several sports teams
Cleveland Hornets, former baseball team
Dandy Town Hornets F.C., Bermuda soccer team
Howick Hornets, New Zealand, rugby league team
Hull Hornets, British American-football team
Montreal Hornets, former Canadian rugby union team
New Orleans Hornets, former National Basketball Association team
Rochdale Hornets, professional rugby league team
Rochdale Hornets (speedway), former speedway team
Watford FC, known as "the Hornets" after their yellow and black kit
The Hornet, a professional wrestler from the United States Wrestling Association

Places
Hornet Township, Beltrami County, Minnesota
Hornet, Missouri, an unincorporated community
Hornet Peak, Queen Maud Land, Antarctica

Media
The Hornet, the student newspaper of Delaware State University
The Hornet, the student newspaper of Fullerton College
The State Hornet, the student newspaper of California State University, Sacramento

Other uses
Hornet Stadium (Sacramento), California State University
Hornet, an amusement ride in Amarillo, Texas, originally known as Mayan Mindbender
Hornet (Hewlett-Packard), a codename for an 80186-compatible embedded processor for the HP 100LX, 200LX and 1000CX palmtop PCs
.17 Hornet, a type of rifle cartridge
.22 Hornet, a type of rifle cartridge